Pycnadena is a genus of trematodes in the family Opecoelidae. It consists of one species, Pycnadena lata (Linton, 1910).

References

Opecoelidae
Plagiorchiida genera
Monotypic protostome genera